This article features the discography of Albanian composer, singer and songwriter Flori Mumajesi. Mumajesi's discography includes a studio albums and numerous singles as a lead artist and featured artist.

Albums

Studio albums

Singles

As lead artist

As featured artist

Videography

As lead artist

As featured artist

See also 
Flori Mumajesi production discography

References 

Discography
Discographies of Albanian artists